Andersonoplatus is a genus of flightless flea beetles belonging to the family Chrysomelidae, subfamily Galerucinae. All 16 species are new to science and discovered from Venezuela and Panama.

Species
This genus includes the following species:

 Andersonoplatus andersoni
 Andersonoplatus baru
 Andersonoplatus bechyneorum
 Andersonoplatus castaneus
 Andersonoplatus flavus
 Andersonoplatus jolyi
 Andersonoplatus laculata
 Andersonoplatus lagunanegra
 Andersonoplatus macubaji
 Andersonoplatus merga
 Andersonoplatus merida
 Andersonoplatus microoculus
 Andersonoplatus peck
 Andersonoplatus rosalesi
 Andersonoplatus sanare
 Andersonoplatus saviniae

References 

  Chrysomelidae in Synopsis of the described Coleoptera of the world

Chrysomelidae genera
Alticini
Wingless beetles